Jan Ekels may refer to:

Jan Ekels the Elder (1724–1781), Dutch painter
Jan Ekels the Younger (1759–1793), Dutch painter